"Faster Than the Speed of Night" is a song by Welsh singer Bonnie Tyler and is the second track from her fourth studio album of the same name (1983). It was written and produced by Jim Steinman and released by Columbia Records in 1983. As the third single from Faster Than the Speed of Night, it followed "Take Me Back" and "Total Eclipse of the Heart".

Music Video 
The music video for "Faster Than the Speed of Night" was filmed at Waverly Abbey located in Tilford, England. Tyler's video for "Have You Ever Seen the Rain?" was filmed nearby, at the grounds of Waverley Abbey House.

Synopsis
The video opens with Tyler taking a young muscular man to a fantasy video game arcade where they proceed to kiss passionately. The video game titles influence the subsequent fantasy sequences. The man dances energetically in black dance underwear while swinging an electric guitar. Tyler is openly desirous of the "pretty boy"...who's "gotta move faster than the speed of night." Cued by various video game titles, the dancers start fighting using the guitars as swords and jousting on motorcycles. Throughout these scenes are shots of Tyler amongst Gothic ruins as she sings about the man pleasing her and she him. The video ends with the arcade manager kicking Tyler and the boy out of the arcade.

Track listing 
 7" single
 "Faster Than the Speed of Night" — 3:30
 "Gonna Get Better" — 3:06

Charts

References

1983 singles
1983 songs
Bonnie Tyler songs
Songs written by Jim Steinman
Song recordings produced by Jim Steinman
Song recordings with Wall of Sound arrangements
Columbia Records singles